James Earl Smith (born January 10, 1973) is a United States Space Force brigadier general who has served as the Deputy United States Military Representative to the North Atlantic Treaty Organization since July 2021. He most recently served as the commander of the Peterson-Schriever Garrison, a new unit in the United States Space Force. He was previously the commander of the 50th Space Wing before it was inactivated and replaced by the Peterson-Schriever Garrison. He was also nominated for transfer to the U.S. Space Force and promotion to brigadier general.

Smith was commissioned in 1997 as the top graduate of the United States Air Force Academy. His operations experience includes directing range support for launch operations from the Eastern Range, Cape Canaveral, Fla., and providing command and control for national reconnaissance and Global Positioning System spacecraft. He transferred to the U.S. Space Force in April 2021.

Education 

 1991 graduate of Meridian High School in Meridian, Idaho
1997 Bachelor of Science, Astronautical Engineering and Japanese language minor, U.S. Air Force Academy, Colorado Springs, Colo.
 1999 Master of Science, Aeronautics and Astronautics, Mass. Institute of Technology, Cambridge
 2001 Squadron Officer School, Maxwell Air Force Base, Ala.
 2003 Air Force Intern Program, Pentagon, Washington, D.C.
 2003 Certificate Program, Organizational Management, George Washington University, Washington, D.C.
 2007 Air Command and Staff College, Maxwell AFB, Ala. by correspondence
 2010 Master of Airpower Art and Science, School of Advanced Air and Space Studies, Maxwell AFB, Ala.
 2012 Air War College, Maxwell AFB, Ala., by correspondence
 2017 Master of Science, National Resource Strategy, Dwight D. Eisenhower School for National Security and Resource Strategy, Washington, D.C.
 2018 Enterprise Leadership Seminar, University of North Carolina, Chapel Hill

Assignments 

1. May 1997 - May 1999, Graduate Student and Charles Stark Draper Fellow, Massachusetts Institute of Technology, Cambridge, Mass.
2. May 1999 - June 2002, Spacecraft Systems Engineer and Chief, GPS Spacecraft Systems Analysis, 2nd Space Operations Squadron, Schriever AFB, Colo.
3. June 2002 - June 2003, Intern, Air Force Intern Program, the Pentagon, Washington, D.C.
4. July 2003 - May 2006, Chief, Space Control Demonstration Operations Flight and Wing Executive Officer, Space Superiority Materiel Wing, Space and Missile Systems Center, Los Angeles AFB, Calif.
5. June 2006 - June 2008, Chief, Space Operations Division and Assistant Operations Officer, Space Operations Squadron, Aerospace Data Facility - Colorado, Buckley AFB, Colo.
6. July 2009 - June 2010, Student, School of Advanced Air and Space Studies, Maxwell AFB, Ala.
7. July 2010 - July 2012, Chief, Mission Area Architecting Branch, Directorate of Requirements, Headquarters Air Force Space Command, Peterson AFB, Colo. (January 2012 - June 2012, Program Manager and Acting Commander, Defense Contract Management Agency-Northern Afghanistan, Bagram Airfield, Afghanistan)
8. August 2012 - May 2014, Commander, 1st Range Operations Squadron, Cape Canaveral AFS, Fla.
9. May 2014 - May 2015, Assistant Executive Officer to the Chief of Staff of the United States Air Force, Headquarters U.S. Air Force, the Pentagon, Washington, D.C.
10. June 2015 - June 2016, Chief, Air Force and Air Defense Security Assistance Team, Office of Security Cooperation-Iraq, U.S. Embassy, Baghdad, Iraq
11. July 2016 - June 2017, Student, Dwight D. Eisenhower School for National Security and Resource Strategy, Fort Lesley J. McNair, Washington, D.C.
12. June 2017 – June 2019, Commander, Air Force Element, and Chief, Mission Operations & Engineering, RAF Menwith Hill, United Kingdom.
13. June 2019 – July 2020, Commander, 50th Space Wing, Schriever AFB, Colo.
14. July 2020 – June 2021, Commander, Peterson-Schriever Garrison, Peterson AFB, Colo.
14. July 2021 – Present, Deputy U.S. Military Representative to the NATO Military Committee, NATO Headquarters, Brussels, Belgium

Awards and decorations 
Smith is the recipient of the following awards:

Writings

Dates of promotion

References 

Living people
Place of birth missing (living people)
United States Air Force Academy alumni
MIT School of Engineering alumni
George Washington University alumni
School of Advanced Air and Space Studies alumni
Dwight D. Eisenhower School for National Security and Resource Strategy alumni
Space Operations Command personnel
United States Air Force colonels
United States Space Force generals
1973 births